Znojile may refer to several settlements in Slovenia: 

Znojile, Kamnik, a settlement in the Municipality of Kamnik
Znojile pri Čepljah, a former settlement in the Municipality of Lukovica
Znojile pri Krki, a settlement in the Municipality of Ivančna Gorica
Znojile pri Studencu, a settlement in the Municipality of Sevnica
Znojile, Tolmin, a settlement in the Municipality of Tolmin
Znojile, Zagorje ob Savi, a settlement in the Municipality of Zagorje ob Savi